The 2008 President's Cup is the 58th season of the President's Cup, a knock-out competition for Maldives' top 4 football clubs. New Radiant are the defending champions, having defeated Victory Sports Club in last season's final.

Broadcasting rights
The broadcasting rights for all the matches of 2008 Maldives President's Cup were given to the Television Maldives.

Qualifier
Top 4 teams at the end of 2008 Dhivehi League will be qualified for the President's Cup.

Final qualifier

Semi-final Qualifier

Semi-final

Final

References
 President's Cup 2008 at RSSSF

President's Cup (Maldives)
Pres